Miraval may refer to:

Raimon de Miraval, medieval troubador
Miraval-Cabardes, French commune
Studio Miraval, French recording studio
Château Miraval, Correns-Var, French wine chateau
Miraval Resorts, Arizona

Revenue, $379M